Richard John Rollins (born April 16, 1938) is an American former Major League Baseball third baseman. He played with the Minnesota Twins (1961–68), Seattle Pilots / Milwaukee Brewers (1969–1970), and Cleveland Indians (1970). During a 10-year baseball career, Rollins hit .269 with 77 home runs, and 399 runs batted in (RBI).

Playing career

Minor League Career 
After playing collegiate baseball at Kent State University from 1958 to 1960, and hitting .358 in his senior year, Rollins was signed for $6,000 as an undrafted free agent by the then Washington Senators prior to the start of the 1960 season and assigned to the Wilson Tobs in the class-B Carolina League. He hit into a triple play in his first professional game, which left a significant impact on his baseball career. As a result, despite the embarrassment, it was the main motivation for Rollins to become a better ballplayer. After hitting .341 with eight home runs and 43 RBI in 62 games, Rollins was promoted to the Single-A Charlotte Hornets in the South Atlantic League to start the 1961 season.

After hitting .270 with four home runs and 16 RBI in 36 early-season games at Charlotte, he was promoted to Triple-A Syracuse in the International League for three games.

Twins career 
Soon after his brief stint in Syracuse, Rollins was promoted to the Twins and made his major league debut on June 16, 1961 against the Chicago White Sox. He finished the game 1-for-4 in Minnesota's 6–1 win. Rollins spent the rest of the season with the Twins as a little-used bench player, batting .294 with 3 RBI in 13 games. During spring training, Rollins started in both shortstop and third base. Twins owner Calvin Griffith saw Rollins' potential in third base, and recommended that Rollins should be given the job over more experienced players like Harmon Killebrew, and John Goryl. Griffith stated that it was Rollins' "sincerity and steadiness" on how he handled the position that proved that he could start in the American League. Having got the job, Rollins responded by hitting .486 over the Twins' first 10 games. Playing in 159 games, Rollins finished the season hitting .298 with 16 home runs and 96 RBI, production that would earn him the nickname, at least among his teammates, of Pie, after Pittsburgh Pirates Hall of Fame third baseman, Pie Traynor Rollins was also compared to former longtime Senators third baseman Ossie Bluege.

Rollins finished eighth in the American League MVP voting and also received the most All-Star Game votes of any American League player, starting both games that year. Rollins represented the Twins well in the games, reaching base three times in six plate appearances and scoring the AL's only run in their 3–1 loss in the July 10 game. Supporting his MVP candidacy and All-Star appearances, Rollins finished in the Top 10 in the league in singles (second), plate appearances (third), sacrifice flies (third), hits (sixth), at-bats (sixth), runs (seventh), on-base percentage (seventh), runs batted in (ninth), and batting average (tenth).

While he finished third in assists by third basemen, his 28 errors were the most by any AL third baseman and second most in the league behind Detroit Tigers' infielder Dick McAuliffe. While Rollins' glove work would never be as bad (his errors would decrease from 28 to eight over the next four seasons), his results at the plate would also decline, despite an almost-as-good 1963 season (.307, 16 home runs, 61 RBI) despite an early-season broken jaw.

On June 9, 1966, in the seventh inning of a game against the Kansas City Athletics, Rollins was one of five Twins players to hit home runs. The others were Harmon Killebrew, Don Mincher, Tony Oliva and Zoilo Versalles. These five home runs still stand as a Major League record for the most home runs hit in a single inning, and were hit off starter Catfish Hunter (two) and relievers Paul Lindblad (two) and John Wyatt (one). During that season, he was platooning at third base with Killebrew and César Tovar, among others.

Later career 
Left exposed to the 1968 expansion draft, Rollins was the 26th pick of the Seattle Pilots on October 15. After backing up Tommy Harper at third base, he was released by the infant Milwaukee Brewers on May 13, 1970, after starting the season hitting .200 with 5 RBI in 14 games. Rollins was immediately signed by the Cleveland Indians, for whom he would finish the season before retiring.

See also
List of Major League Baseball annual triples leaders

References

External links

Rich Rollins MLB - Baseballbiography.com
Bio from Cool of the Evening: The 1965 Minnesota Twins
Interview of Rich Rollins conducted by Dan Coughlin at Cleveland Public Library on September 11, 2017.

1938 births
Living people
American League All-Stars
Baseball players from Pennsylvania
Charlotte Hornets (baseball) players
Cleveland Indians players
Kent State Golden Flashes baseball players
Major League Baseball third basemen
Milwaukee Brewers players
Minnesota Twins players
People from Mount Pleasant, Pennsylvania
People from Parma, Ohio
Seattle Pilots players
Syracuse Chiefs players
Wilson Tobs players